= Tunisian National Solidarity Fund =

- Founded: 1992
- Purpose: "Developing a basic economic platform by guaranteeing minimal revenue sources"
- Location: Tunisia
- Method: Development, Financial endowment

The Tunisian National Solidarity Fund (also known as the 26-26 Fund after its postal account number or as FSN) is a public-service institution which relies on both public and private donations for the implementation of development projects in favor of underprivileged social categories and needy individuals.

The FSN aims at fighting poverty by promoting the disadvantaged areas (often referred to as "shadow areas") by setting up an adequate infrastructure and improving the living conditions of the populations in those areas as well as providing them with the basics of a decent life, developing their resources, creating employment projects and including these areas in the country’s socio-economic development processes.

== History ==
The FSN was created on December 8, 1992, following an unexpected visit by President Zine El Abidine Ben Ali to two secluded and destitute villages, "Zwakra" and "Barrama" in the south-eastern part of the country. That visit was to be the launch pad of a continuing anti-poverty campaign.

This fund is credited at least in part for Tunisia's success since 1987 in reducing the poverty rate from 12% to a mere 3.8% currently. Some analysts point out that curtailing poverty was one of the factors which have enabled Tunisia to overcome the threat of fundamentalist extremism, as poor areas used to be the breeding ground for radical Islamist formations.

== Fund goals ==
The FSN is funded essentially by the State’s grants and by donations by Tunisian citizens and private companies on a totally voluntary basis. Tunisian society reacted with enthusiasm to President Zine El Abidine Ben Ali’s calls upon citizens to show solidarity with the needy. Thus, December 8 of every year—the historical date which marks the launch the Fund—witnesses a steady flow by Tunisians to various donation centers in order to contribute to the Fund.

The goals of the FSN are:

1. Operating in remote ("shadow") areas which lack a basic infrastructure.
2. Creating and/or improving the basic infrastructure of these areas: roads, paths, electricity, drinkable water, schools, basic health centers, leisure spaces, etc.
3. Setting up economic activities for the populations of these areas through small loans, particularly in the fields of agriculture, fishing, and handicrafts.
4. Eradicating rudimentary and decayed homes and replacing them by new and decent ones.

The FSN is funded essentially by the State’s grants and by donations by Tunisian citizens and private companies on a totally voluntary basis. Tunisian society reacted with enthusiasm to President Zine El Abidine Ben Ali’s calls upon citizens to show solidarity with the needy. Thus, December 8 of every year—the historical date which marks the launch the Fund—witnesses a steady flow by Tunisians to various donation centers in order to contribute to the Fund. All the funds collected go towards implementing projects. There are no overhead costs nor are the funds used to pay employees of the fund.

== Results ==
Ever since its creation till to date, the FSN has realized thousands of projects involving hundreds of millions of Tunisian Dinars in favor of the underprivileged categories, thus meeting most of its objectives. Indeed, the FSN has been able to bring about a perceptible change in the life quality of those categories as well as in the landscape of the once secluded and poor areas. Amongst these realizations are:

1. The construction of more than 40.000 new and decent homes
2. The improvement of circa 30.000 homes
3. Asphalting and upgrading nearly 5000 kilometers of paths, lanes, and roads
4. More than 73.000 families have benefited from connection to the electricity supply
5. More than 84.000 families have benefited from connection to drinkable water supply
6. The creation and upgrading of 141 Basic Health Centers
7. The creation and equipment of 136 schools
8. The contribution to the funding of the national social housing program
9. The upgrading of special centers for the handicapped
10. Promoting employment and the generation of income sources through the grants and aids
11. The contribution to the funding of the World Solidarity Fund by almost 14 million Tunisian Dinars
